Colaiste Ghobnatan is an all Irish school in the Muskerry Gaeltacht. There are approximately 200 students and 20 teachers, and a great emphasis is placed on speaking Irish throughout the school.

Catchment Area
The students of the school come from a variety of National Schools. Those include Ballyvourney, Killnamartyra, Coolea, Reanaree, Clondrohid, Glenflesk and Killarney. Formerly, some students came from Kilgarvan national school, but with the opening of Pobal Scoil Inbhearscéine, they reduced until they were no more.

History
The school opened in the 1940s as a school for boys. Within 3 decades, it was also accepting girls from the area. In the 1980s, a huge blow came to the community when the other school, Colaiste Íosagán, closed its doors to students. This proved as a boost to pupil numbers in Colaiste Ghobnatan.

Sport
The school also has a great emphasis on sports. During the physical education classes, a variety of sports are played including football, hurling, hockey, soccer, rugby, basketball, dodgeball, volleyball among others. In 2009, the school's Senior Gaelic football team came to prominence in the VEC B Football Championship. They came to the All-Ireland semi-final in Killmallock, Co. Limerick, where they were beaten by Granard. The schools team was led by Kerryman, Gudence Councillor and former Limerick football county manager Mickey O'Sullivan and fellow Kerryman and Woodwork teacher Shane Dennehey.

References

External links 
 School website

Schools in the Republic of Ireland